TAROM (legally Compania Națională de Transporturi Aeriene Române TAROM S.A.) is the flag carrier and oldest currently operating airline of Romania, based in Otopeni near Bucharest. Its headquarters and its main hub are at Henri Coandă International Airport. It is currently the first and largest airline operating in Romania based on international destinations, international flights and the second-largest measured by fleet size and passengers carried.

Over ninety-seven percent (97.22%) of TAROM is owned by the Romanian Government (Ministry of Transport). The airline transported almost 2.75 million passengers in 2018, with an average load factor of 74%. The airline joined SkyTeam on 25 June 2010.

History

The beginnings
The history of the Romanian National Air Transport Company can be traced back to 1920, when CFRNA - (French-Romanian Company for Air Navigation) was founded. On 13 April 1920, the company registered its headquarters at 194 Rue Rivoli, in Paris. A decree issued on 26 April 1920 establishes Direcțiunea Aviației (The Directorate of Aviation), in the subordination of the Ministry of Communications. In the same year, the Kingdom of Romania offered CFRNA exploitation rights. The country offered the airline two aerodromes: one in Arad, and another one in Bucharest-Băneasa. The airline used French-built Potez 15 aircraft for its passenger/mail service between Paris and Bucharest via several cities in Central Europe. In 1925, the city of Galați became the first destination in Romania served by regular flights followed, from 24 June 1926, by an extended service to Iași and Chișinău. Ten de Havilland DH.9 and five Ansaldo A.300, in addition to the Potez aircraft, operated the service.

In 1928 the airline changed its name to SNNA (Serviciul Național de Navigație Aeriană, The National Air Navigation Service). On 9 July 1930, the company adopted the name LARES (Liniile Aeriene Române Exploatate de Stat, Romanian State-Operated Air Lines) while 20 July 1937 saw the merger of LARES with its competitor, SARTA (Societatea Anonimă Română de Transporturi Aeriene).

Post-World War II
Immediately after World War II, in 1945, when the Soviet Union had extended its influence across Eastern Europe, a new reorganization replaced LARES with TARS (Transporturi Aeriene Româno-Sovietice), jointly owned by the governments of Romania and the Soviet Union. Domestic operations were started from Bucharest (Băneasa Airport) on 1 February 1946, when TARS took overall air services and aircraft from LARES.

Over the following decade, the company's Soviet share was purchased by the Romanian government and, on 18 September 1954, the airline adopted the name of TAROM (Transporturi Aeriene Române, Romanian Air Transport). By 1960, TAROM was flying to a dozen cities across Europe. 1966 saw the operation of its first transatlantic flight. On 14 May 1974, it launched a regular service to New York City (John F. Kennedy International Airport).

Being part of the regional group of airlines within Eastern Bloc states meant that for much of its history TAROM has operated Soviet-designed aircraft. These included Lisunov Li-2s, Ilyushin Il-14s, Ilyushin Il-18 long-range turboprops, Ilyushin Il-62 long-range jet airliners, Antonov An-24 regional turboprops, and Tupolev Tu-154 medium-range tri-jets. As was the case with several other nations, the Il-62 was the first long-range jet airliner to be put into operation by Romania, in 1973. Five examples (three Il-62s and two later version Il-62Ms) were owned by TAROM, which also leased the aircraft to other operators.

An exception to Soviet-built aircraft was made in 1968, when TAROM bought six BAC One-Eleven 400s for European and Middle East destinations, and in 1974 when it acquired Boeing 707 aircraft to share its long-haul operations with the Il-62. Plans were made to acquire Vickers VC10 aircraft as well, but in the end, the Soviets did not allow it, and made them buy the Il-62 instead. With 59 aircraft in operation, in the late '70s, TAROM had the largest fleet in the Eastern Bloc, after Aeroflot.

In 1978, a contract was signed with the UK enabling Rombac to manufacture the BAC One Eleven at Romaero, near Bucharest. Meanwhile, the 707 and Il-62 long-range aircraft were operating New York (via Amsterdam, later London and finally Vienna), Abu-Dhabi-Bangkok-Singapore, and Karachi-Beijing. TAROM was the only Eastern Bloc airline to operate flights to Tel Aviv, Israel.

During the mid 1980s, TAROM leased Tupolev Tu-154 jets to Guyana Airways and also supported these aircraft which were operated in scheduled passenger service between Georgetown, Guyana in South America and both Miami and New York City.

The 1990s
After the collapse of the communist regime in 1989, the airline, operating a fleet of 65 aircraft of six basic types, was able to acquire more Western-built jets. In 1992, TAROM bought 3 Airbus A310 planes, nicknamed: "Transilvania" (YR-LCA), "Moldova" (YR-LCB) and "Muntenia" (YR-LCC). By 1993, TAROM had introduced long-haul flights to Montreal and Bangkok using Ilyushin Il-62 and Airbus A310 aircraft. The YR-LCC Airbus A310 joined TAROM's fleet on 10 April 1994, to then crash near Balotești on 31 March 1995.

During the 1990s, TAROM replaced its long-haul fleet of Boeing 707s and IL-62s with Airbus A310s (the last Il-62 being sold in 1999).

2000s and 2010s
TAROM is recovering from a difficult period that began in the 1990s when losses of up to $68 million per year were registered, caused by unprofitable routes. At the beginning of the new millennium, the airline initiated a programme that was aimed at restoring profitability. This was achieved by terminating loss-making intercontinental services. In 2001, the airline cancelled its non-profitable long-haul services to Bangkok and Montreal and also terminated services to its remaining intercontinental destinations of Chicago in 2002, and Beijing and New York City in 2003. TAROM terminated loss-making domestic services to Craiova, Tulcea, Caransebeș, and Constanța, and focused its activity on service to key destinations in Europe and the Middle East. TAROM has decided to focus its operations on Bucharest (Henri Coandă International Airport) (OTP) and Cluj-Napoca International Airport (CLJ), and initiated direct international flights from Sibiu International Airport. 2004 was the first profitable year of the last decade. By 2005, TAROM tried selling its A310 fleet three times, which was being preserved since 2003.

A fleet upgrade programme started in 2006 with the acquisition of four Airbus A318s, three Boeing 737-800s, and two ATR 72-500s, which resulted in a fleet increase to 26 by 2009.

From 2003 till 2007, the airline spent €1 million per year to preserve "Moldova" and "Transilvania". In 2007, TAROM modernized its two Airbus A310 planes at the Airbus plant in Bordeaux. After being reconditioned, the pair was used in medium-haul flights, which weren't successful.

The airline had a frequent-flyer programme "Smart Miles", which was turned into Flying Blue on 5 June 2010. Codeshare agreements with foreign partner airlines are in place for several international routes. On 25 June 2010, TAROM joined SkyTeam as the alliance's thirteenth member.

Starting with November 2012, in accordance with the Romanian state-company legislation, TAROM was led by a private manager, the Belgian Christian Heinzmann occupying the positions of CEO and Accountable Manager until March 2016. During Heinzmann's leadership, the company reduced its financial losses by more than 75%, grew its yearly passenger number to a record 2.4 million and stabilised its load-factor around 70%. However, broad reforms like the fleet renewal and harmonisation, as well as the establishment of profit centers such as the TAROM Maintenance and TAROM Charter services, were not accomplished due to a constant lack of a decision from the company's board of administrators.

On 12 September and 29 October 2016, TAROM retired their remaining two Airbus A310-300s after final flights from Madrid to Bucharest. The A310s will be replaced with new smaller aircraft. In May 2017, TAROM received its first of two leased Boeing 737-800s. Another two ex-Malaysian Airlines 737-800 were added to the fleet in 2018 and a contract for five Boeing 737 MAX 8 was signed with deliveries stated to begin in 2023. On 27 December 2019, the Ministry of Transport announced that 9 new ATR 72-600 leased from Nordic Aviation Capital for a 10 year-period would replace the existent ATR 42-500 and 72-500, manufactured in 1999–2000 and 2009, respectively. TAROM received the first four aircraft in February 2020, with the first one, registered with code YR-ATJ, landing in Bucharest on 18 February 2020, at 2:50 PM EET.

2020s 
TAROM was directly affected by the COVID-19 pandemic, ceasing temporarily all scheduled operations starting with 25 March 2020. TAROM operated flights for the Romanian Government during the state of emergency, bringing some medical equipments from China. After the state of emergency expired, TAROM resumed scheduled operations from May 2020. 

In 2021, TAROM's then new CEO stated that none of the airline's current routes are profitable. In October 2022, it has been reported that the operator of Henri Coandă International Airport, TAROM's home base, considers legal action against the airline over unpaid fees exceeding 10 million Euros and also might suspend all services for the carrier.

Corporate affairs

Ownership
TAROM is a state-owned company, with shareholding structure as follows:

Business trends
Figures for recent years are shown below (for years ending 31 December):

Logo and livery

The TAROM logo, representing a swallow in flight, has been used on all TAROM aircraft since 1954. The 1970s livery had the logo on the tail painted in red, with a red cheatline. The livery introduced in the early 1990s (on the Airbus A310 aircraft) is an overall-white scheme with the titles and the tailfin painted in dark blue. The current colour scheme (introduced in 2006 on the A318) is a slightly modified version of the previous one, with an oversized logo on the tailfin, and the engine pods also painted in dark blue.

All aircraft in the TAROM fleet receive a "name" which is a Romanian toponym. For instance, the names of the ATR aircraft in the fleet are related to the rivers of Romania, the Boeing aircraft bear names of Romanian cities, the Airbus long-haul aircraft bear Romanian historical province names, while the Airbus A318s bear names of Romanian aviation pioneers.

In 2009, marking the airline's 55th anniversary, a Boeing 737-700 (YR-BGG "Craiova") was painted in a retro jet colour scheme, representing the airline's first livery used in the 1950s on Lisunov Li-2 aircraft.

TAROM Technical Division
The TAROM Technical Division provides aircraft maintenance services for the entire fleet of the company and the fleet of other national and international companies. The objective of TAROM Technical Department is to be the best and the most efficient, in terms of costs, maintenance service provider for Boeing 737, ATR 42 and ATR 72 aircraft in Central and Eastern Europe. The services provided by the TAROM Technical Department include unscheduled maintenance works, scheduled maintenance works and repair works for spare parts.

The major maintenance activity is performed in the hangar of the technical department, built between 1969 and 1972, with an area of 6,000 m and restored in 2000 to fully comply with EASA (European Safety Aviation Agency) and FAA (Federal Aviation Administration) standards. The hangar is equipped to perform all types of inspections for TAROM fleet, and the personnel is qualified and licensed for all types of aircraft in the fleet. Maintenance activities for 3 to 6 aircraft, depending on their size, may be carried out simultaneously in the hangar. The hangar is equipped with a full MERO system for B737 docking.

The most important maintenance capacities of the TAROM Technical Department include full maintenance services for Boeing 737 and ATR42/72 aircraft, inspection capacity type C for Airbus A310 and A318 aircraft, total painting, interior cleaning, modifications.

The technical department also provides safe storage facilities for spare parts and materials necessary for maintenance activity, dedicated spaces for chemicals, special tools and testing equipment, and quarantine spaces. The TAROM Technical Department also provides conveyance services (packaging, preparation of documents, customs) and acceptance services (customs, disassembly, and reception inspection) for various substances and equipment.

Destinations

The airline directly operates 50 destinations including charter and seasonal services in 22 countries in Europe, the Middle East and Northern Africa including 8 domestic destinations.
The airline's flights to the USA ceased in 2003 and are now operated under a codeshare agreement with Air France via Paris-Charles de Gaulle Airport.

Alliances
In 2006, TAROM was scheduled to join SkyTeam as an associate member (sponsored by Alitalia), but the entry into the alliance was postponed until 2008. On 7 May that year, SkyTeam signed a SkyTeam Alliance Associate Adherence Agreement (SAAAA) with TAROM. On 22 June 2010, SkyTeam announced that it had renewed its membership program, thereby making TAROM a future full member of the alliance. On 25 June 2010, TAROM became a full member of SkyTeam.

Codeshare agreements
TAROM has codeshare agreements with the following airlines since January 2020:

 Aegean Airlines
 Aeroflot
 Air Europa 
 Air France 
 Air Serbia 
 airBaltic
 Austrian Airlines
 Brussels Airlines
 Bulgaria Air
 Czech Airlines
 ITA Airways
 KLM
 Middle East Airlines
 Royal Jordanian Airlines
 Turkish Airlines

Fleet

Current fleet
, the TAROM fleet consists of the following aircraft:

Fleet development

Short-haul fleet 
TAROM has agreed in 2019 to lease 9 ATR 72-600 aircraft from Nordic Aviation Capital in order to replace existing ATR 42-500 and ATR 72-500 aircraft. In 2021, the order was reduced from 9 to 7 ATR 72-600.

Medium-haul fleet 
After the retiring of Airbus A310s in 2016, two new Boeing 737-800 were leased in 2017. In 2018, another two Boeing 737-800 were leased. Also, at the Farnborough Air Show, the Government of Romania signed the contract for buying 5 Boeing 737 MAX-8 at an estimated value of $586 mil. As of 2022, TAROM negotiates with a few leasing companies for 4 to 8 Boeing 737 MAX-8. Airbus A318s and Boeing 737-700s are going to be retired soon, while Boeing 737-300s were retired in 2021.

Long-haul fleet 
TAROM had been planning to lease three widebody aircraft to resume long-haul operations to China and the United States after the withdrawal of its Airbus A310s. The Request For Proposals (RFP) to leasing firms expired on 31 August 2017. In 2018, TAROM made efforts to lease some Boeing 787s, but there is no further information.

VIP fleet 
In 2018, the CEO of that time declared TAROM could operate a legacy aircraft with maximum 10 seats, which could fly over Atlantic, in order to be leased by the Romanian Government, the Presidential Administration, in business affairs or in medical emergencies. There is no further information. Between 2010 and 2013, under Băsescu administration, TAROM operated an Airbus A310-300 for presidential purposes.

Former fleet
During its history, TAROM also operated the following aircraft types:

 Airbus A310-300
 Antonov An-2
 Antonov An-24
 ATR 42
 BAC One-Eleven
 ROMBAC 1-11
 Boeing 707
 Boeing 737-300
 Boeing 737-500
 Ilyushin Il-14
 Ilyushin Il-18
 Ilyushin Il-62
 Lisunov Li-2
 McDonnell Douglas DC-10
 Mil Mi-4
 Tupolev Tu-154

Incidents and accidents
 On 4 November 1957, a TAROM Ilyushin Il-14P, registration YR-PCC, operating an international administrative flight from Bucharest to Moscow crashed short of the runway at Vnukovo Airport, killing four of 16 on board. The aircraft was on approach to Vnukovo Airport when the pilot noticed that the aircraft was too low, however, the aircraft continued its descent until it struck treetops and later crashed. The aircraft was carrying Romanian government members Chivu Stoica, Grigore Preoteasa, Alexandru Moghioroș, Ștefan Voitec, Nicolae Ceaușescu, Leonte Răutu and Marin Năstase to Moscow for the 40th anniversary of the October Revolution. Preoteasa, who apparently was not wearing a safety belt, and three Soviet crew members lost their lives.
 On 24 February 1962 an Ilyushin Il-18V, registration YR-IMB, operating on an international scheduled flight from Bucharest Otopeni Airport (OTP) to Tel Aviv via Nicosia lost power on all four engines and made a belly landing on a grassy field in Cyprus. All 100 occupants survived. The aircraft was transported to Moscow for repairs, but it never re-entered service.
 On 16 June 1963, a VEB 14P (YR-ILL) flying from Munich to Constanța entered a dive and crashed near the village of Békéssámson, Hungary following engine problems, killing all 31 on board.
The aircraft had flown into a strong downdraft; the pilot attempted to maintain altitude, but this caused the fuselage to overstress and break up.
 On 11 August 1966, a Lisunov Li-2, registration YR-TAN, crashed in the Lotrioara Valley en route from Brașov to Constanţa, killing all 24 on board.
 On 4 February 1970, TAROM Flight 35, an Antonov An-24, registration YR-AMT, operating a domestic scheduled flight from Bucharest to Oradea struck the side of a mountain in the Vlădeasa mountain group, killing 20 of 21 on board; although nine survived the crash, eight died in the low temperatures before rescuers reached the crash site. The aircraft began descending too soon in poor visibility until it struck treetops on a mountainside, after which it struck the slope of a second mountain. The aircraft was leased from the Romanian government.
On 7 August 1980, a Tupolev Tu-154B-1 registered YR-TPH, operating on an international scheduled flight from Bucharest Otopeni Airport to Nouadhibou Airport, Mauritania ditched in the water  short of the runway at Nouadhibou Airport. The crew could not see the runway while descending through the  decision height. A missed approach procedure was initiated when the pilot felt contact with what he thought was ground but was actually water. All of the 152 passengers and 16 crew members survived the impact, but a passenger suffered a heart attack and died before he could be rescued. Most of the passengers were sailors who were going to replace the crew of two Romanian ships located on the Mauritanian coast. Many passengers swam to the land, while sharks were kept away by the vibrations of an engine which continued to function for a few hours after the crash.
On 5 September 1986, an Antonov An-24 registered YR-AMF operating on a domestic scheduled flight from Bucharest Băneasa Airport touched down nose wheel-first while landing at Cluj Airport. A fire erupted, killing three crew members who were trapped in the cockpit. The other two crew members and all fifty passengers survived.
On 28 December 1989, during the Romanian Revolution, an Antonov An-24 flying from Bucharest to Belgrade, carrying Sunday Times journalist Ian Henry Parry, was shot down by a missile at Vișina, Dâmbovița. All the people on board (six crew members and the passenger) died.

On 13 August 1991, TAROM Flight 785A, an Ilyushin Il-18, flying from Otopeni to Timișoara Airport crashed in the Retezat Mountains during a repositioning flight. The flight crew, and an aircraft maintenance crew, all consisting of 9 people, died instantly. Whilst the official cause of the crash was attributed to pilot error (the pilots did not use radar instruments and only assumed their positions, thus getting lost), the secrecy regarding the crash sparked a few conspiracy theories, which include sabotage, accidental shootdown from a nearby surface-to-air missiles unit (a theory later dismissed by the MApN), and UFOs that tricked the pilots into believing they had arrived at their destination, linked to the sightings of unusual lights on 4 August 1991.
On 24 September 1994, TAROM Flight 381, an Airbus A310 registered YR-LCA flying from Bucharest to Paris Orly, went into a sudden and uncommanded nose-up position and stalled. The crew attempted to countermand the aircraft's flight control system but were unable to get the nose down while remaining on course. Witnesses saw the aircraft climb with an extreme nose-up attitude, then bank sharply left, then right, then fall into a steep dive. Only when the dive produced additional speed was the crew able to recover steady flight. An investigation found that an overshoot of flap placard speed during the approach, incorrectly commanded by the captain, caused a mode transition to flight level change. The auto-throttles increased power and trim went full nose-up as a result. The aircraft landed safely after a second approach. There were 186 people on board.
On 31 March 1995, a TAROM Airbus A310 operating as Flight 371 crashed near Balotești due to a fault in the throttles and lack of recovery from the flight crew. All 49 passengers and 11 crew members were killed.
On 30 December 2007, a TAROM Boeing 737-300 (YR-BGC "Constanța"), flying Flight 3107 hit a car on the runway of Bucharest Henri Coandă International Airport while taking off for Sharm-el-Sheikh. The aircraft stopped beside the runway and was severely damaged. None of the passengers were injured. Because of fog, neither the tower nor the pilots saw the car belonging to staff who were repairing a runway beacon.
On 9 July 2019, a TAROM ATR 42-500 (YR-ATF) burst the tyres of the main landing gear wheels at Bucharest Henri Coandă International Airport while conducting the landing of Flight 638 from Satu Mare. None of the passengers were injured. An internal safety investigation was conducted, with a report being published on 11 September 2019. TAROM's report concluded that the tyre explosions were caused by the parking brakes being engaged on contact with the runway. The brakes locked shortly after contact with the runway. This resulted in the bursting of all four tyres of the main landing wheels. The early engagement of parking brakes were attributed to pilot error. Specifically, poor cockpit resource management (CRM).

See also
List of companies of Romania
Aviation in Romania

References

Citations

Bibliography

External links

Official website

Airlines of Romania
Association of European Airlines members
Companies based in Bucharest
Airlines established in 1954
Government-owned airlines
Romanian brands
SkyTeam
1954 establishments in Romania
Government-owned companies of Romania